Al Paul (c. 1926 – July 28, 2014) was an American college athlete, football and lacrosse coach, and college athletics administrator.  He served as the athletic director at Columbia University from 1974 to 1991.  A native of Baltimore, Maryland, Paul attended Western Maryland College—now known as McDaniel College—where he played football, basketball, and lacrosse.   While an undergraduate, he also served as the school's head lacrosse coach, in 1947 and 1948.  Paul died at the age of 88 on July 28, 2014, at his home in Maryland.

References

Year of birth missing
1920s births
2014 deaths
Columbia Lions athletic directors
Columbia Lions football coaches
Hofstra Pride football coaches
McDaniel Green Terror football players
McDaniel Green Terror men's basketball players
McDaniel Green Terror men's lacrosse coaches
McDaniel Green Terror men's lacrosse players
Basketball players from Baltimore
Lacrosse players from Baltimore
Players of American football from Baltimore
American men's basketball players